The Ragtime Ephemeralist was an infrequently-published magazine about ragtime music put together by cartoonist and ragtime aficionado Chris Ware. The first issue was published in 1998. It was based in Oak Park, Illinois. As of 2019 only three issues were published, the last appearing in 2002.

References

External links

Defunct magazines published in the United States
Irregularly published magazines published in the United States
Magazines established in 1998
Magazines disestablished in 2002
Magazines published in Maryland
Music magazines published in the United States
Ragtime